A Gas contractor is a person or a group of persons that are professionally licensed, bonded, and insured to deal in all aspects of natural or propane gas installs, repairs, sales and service. This person or persons would be contracted by heating, plumbing, general contractors, homeowners or business owners, to install, repair, or modify any or all gas lines.

Natural gas